The 1990–91 WHL season was the 25th season for the Western Hockey League.  Fourteen teams completed a 72-game season.  The Spokane Chiefs won the President's Cup before going on to win the Memorial Cup.

Regular season

Final standings

Scoring leaders
Note: GP = Games played; G = Goals; A = Assists; Pts = Points; PIM = Penalties in minutes

1991 WHL Playoffs

All-Star game

On February 5, the East division defeated the West division 8–2 at Calgary, Alberta before a crowd of 7,473.

WHL awards

All-Star Teams

See also
1990–91 OHL season
1990–91 QMJHL season
1991 Memorial Cup
1991 NHL Entry Draft
1990 in sports
1991 in sports

References
whl.ca
 2005–06 WHL Guide

Western Hockey League seasons
WHL
WHL